Pasquale Di Sabatino (born 20 January 1988, in Atri) is a professional racing driver from Italy. He has previously competed in the Formula Renault 3.5 Series where he was a race winner. He drove in the World Touring Car Championship for bamboo-engineering in 2012.

Career

Formula Junior
After an early career in karting, Di Sabatino stepped up to single–seaters in 2005, racing in the Italian Formula Junior 1600 series. Driving for the Tomcat Racing team, he secured ten podium places in twelve races, including five victories, to comfortably win the title ahead of Mihai Marinescu and former Scuderia Toro Rosso Formula One driver Jaime Alguersuari.

Formula Renault 2.0
In November 2005, Di Sabatino graduated to Formula Renault, taking part in the Italian Formula Renault 2.0 Winter Series held at Adria International Raceway. In the four races he contested he took one podium place to finish tenth in the standings.

The following year, he raced in the full Italian Formula Renault 2.0 championship, but failed to score a point in the twelve races he entered.

Formula Renault 3.5 Series
In July 2006, Di Sabatino made his debut in the Formula Renault 3.5 Series, replacing Miloš Pavlović at Italian team Cram Competition. He failed to score a point in the ten races he contested, with his best result being a pair of 16th place finishes.

For 2007, Di Sabatino took part in a full season with another Italian team, GD Racing. He took one points finish during the season, a ninth place at Spa–Francorchamps, to finish 26th in the championship. During the off–season, he tested for both RC Motorsport and Comtec Racing before signing for the latter in January 2008.

At the first race of the 2008 season in Monza, Di Sabatino finished second to Dutchman Giedo van der Garde, scoring his best Formula Renault 3.5 Series finish at the time. He followed that up with a tenth place finish in the second race and then an eighth place at Spa–Francorchamps a week later. However, Di Sabatino was forced to vacate his seat after the Le Mans round after encountering sponsorship issues.

In March 2009, Di Sabatino tested again for RC Motorsport at the Circuit de Catalunya in Spain before signing for the team early the following month. After scoring points in three of the first four races, Di Sabatino finally claimed his maiden series victory in the second race of the Hungaroring event in mid–June. Before the end of the season, Di Sabatino ran out of funding and had to give up his seat at RC. Despite this, he finished twelfth in the championship.

Formula Three
For the 2010 season, Di Sabatino returned to his native Italy to compete in the Italian Formula Three Championship for Alan Racing.
After failing to score a point in any of the opening four races, he left the team after the second round of the year at Hockenheim. He missed the following round of the series at Imola before being signed by RC Motorsport to replace Francesco Castellacci at Mugello, who missed the event due to illness.

However, Di Sabatino, along with his team–mate Frédéric Vervisch, failed to start either race of the meeting after encountering engine problems during practice.

Auto GP
Di Sabatino competed in the Auto GP series in 2011, replacing Samuele Buttarelli at Ombra Racing, with Buttarelli moving to fellow Italian team TP Formula. Di Sabatino followed him after the first round, he completed the season with TP Formula and finished 12th in the championship.

World Touring Car Championship

In February 2012, it was confirmed that Di Sabatino would switch to touring cars, racing in the World Touring Car Championship for Bamboo Engineering. He raced a Chevrolet Cruze 1.6T alongside fellow newcomer Alex MacDowall. He was replaced by Michel Nykjær for the Race of Brazil having suffered from bronchitis and pneumonia and not being able to fly. Di Sabatino did not return to the championship in 2012 and was not classified in the drivers' championship having scored no points.

Racing record

Career summary

Complete Formula Renault 3.5 Series results
(key) (Races in bold indicate pole position) (Races in italics indicate fastest lap)

Complete Auto GP results
(key) (Races in bold indicate pole position) (Races in italics indicate fastest lap)

Complete World Touring Car Championship results
(key) (Races in bold indicate pole position) (Races in italics indicate fastest lap)

References

External links

 
 
 

1988 births
Living people
Sportspeople from the Province of Teramo
Italian racing drivers
Italian Formula Renault 2.0 drivers
Italian Formula Three Championship drivers
World Series Formula V8 3.5 drivers
Auto GP drivers
World Touring Car Championship drivers
Italian Formula Renault 1.6 drivers
Ombra Racing drivers
RC Motorsport drivers
Comtec Racing drivers
Cram Competition drivers
Engstler Motorsport drivers
Craft-Bamboo Racing drivers